Pongsakorn Nimawan is a volleyball player from Thailand and is a member of the men's national volleyball team.

Club 
  Kasetsart VC (2016–present)

References

Pongsakorn Nimawan
Living people
Volleyball players at the 2006 Asian Games
Volleyball players at the 2010 Asian Games
1984 births
Pongsakorn Nimawan
Southeast Asian Games medalists in volleyball
Competitors at the 2007 Southeast Asian Games
Pongsakorn Nimawan